Cumilla Cantonment is a cantonment located near Mainamati, Cumilla city in Bangladesh. The personnel of Bangladesh Army with local civilian inhabit here. The 33rd Infantry Division HQ is also located here. It has an area of 3000 acres.

History
During the Second World War, a jungle warfare school was set up at Comilla by the 14th Indian Infantry Division, after the mid-1942 Allied retreat from Burma. The school emphasized techniques in six areas key to successful fighting in jungle terrain: outflanking, being outflanked, ambushing and other minor tactics, the myth of the impenetrable jungle, health, and fitness. The school was transferred to Sevoke in 1943.

In 1943-1944, military contractors constructing what was then called Mainamati Cantonment disturbed and damaged unsurveyed archaeological remains at the site. Later the base was renamed Comilla Cantonment.

Bangladesh Military Academy was initially established at Comilla Cantonment on 11 January 1974 and later relocated at Bhatiary in 1976.

Based units
 33rd Infantry Division
 44th Infantry Brigade
 33rd Artillery Brigade
 101 Infantry Brigade   
 School of Military Intelligence
 Area Headquarters, Comilla Area
 Station Headquarters, Comilla
 5 Signal Battalion 
 Static Signal Company, Comilla Area
 33 MP, Comilla Area
 Ordinance Depo
 6 cavalry
 2 Engineers Battalion

Education
 Army Medical College, Comilla
 Bangladesh Army International University of Science & Technology (BAIUST)
 Cumilla Cadet College
 Ispahani Public School & College, Comilla
 Cantonment College, Comilla
 Cantonment Board Girl's High School, Comilla
 Comilla Cantonment High School
 Mainamati English School & College (MESC)

Hospital 
 Mainamati Cantonment General Hospital
 Combined Military Hospital, Comilla

See also 
 Mainamati War Cemetery

References 

Cantonments of Bangladesh